Palmer is a small unorganized hamlet located 15 km east of the town of Gravelbourg in Sutton Rural Municipality No. 103, Saskatchewan, Canada. The population of Palmer fluctuates during the year, hovering in the double digits with peak population occurring in the summer months. The main reason of this spike is due to the efforts of the residents to establish Palmer as a venue for performing artists. In 2006 the hamlet had a population of 27 people. It previously held the status of village until January 1, 2002.

History 
Prior to January 1, 2002, Palmer was incorporated as a village, and was restructured as a hamlet under the jurisdiction of the Rural municipality of Sutton on that date.

Demographics 

History of the church
The prominent structure in Palmer is St. Oliver's Catholic Church which closed its doors in 1970. Eventually purchased by Mr. Bowler from his grandfather's estate, the building became simply known as "The Church".

The first mass was held by Father Gravel on May 17, 1914 and in the spirit of historical recognition, the residents of Palmer will be held a Centennial Celebration on May 17, 2014, highlighted by a music festival with the main stage located within the church.

See also
List of communities in Saskatchewan
Hamlets of Saskatchewan

References

Sutton No. 103, Saskatchewan
Designated places in Saskatchewan
Former villages in Saskatchewan
Unincorporated communities in Saskatchewan
Populated places disestablished in 2002
Division No. 3, Saskatchewan